Dalbergia monticola  is a species of flowering plant in the legume family Fabaceae. It is endemic to Madagascar. It occurs at higher elevation, which gave the species its name.

Description

Vegetative characters 
Dalbergia monticola is a deciduous tree up to 30 m tall. The leaves are imparipinnate, 3.5–12 cm long, and have a hairy rachis. The 20–35 alternate leaflets are 0.3–1.7 cm long, mostly glabrous and glossy above, and densely pubescent beneath. The leaflets often become very coriaceous, with strongly revolute margins, when dried on herbarium sheets.

Generative characters 
It forms terminal inflorescences (sometimes also in the upper leaf axils) that are paniculate and around the same length as the subtending leaves. The flowers are white, 5–6 mm long, and have a violin-shaped standard petal and pubescent gynoecium. The fruits contain one to three seeds. The pericarp is net-veined over the entire surface, the network raised but not thickened or fissured over the seeds.

Similar species 
 Dalbergia baronii
 Dalbergia pseudobaronii

Habitat and distribution 
Dalbergia monticola inhabits evergreen humid mid-altitude forests along the eastern escarpment of Madagascar, extending onto the Central High Plateau as well as onto the Northern Highlands. It occurs at an altitude of around 250–1600 m.

Uses 
It produces a durable heartwood that is locally used for cabinet making. It was internationally traded, notably to produce guitar bodies and fingerboards, amongst others.

Conservation status 
The IUCN Red List lists Dalbergia monticola as vulnerable. It was considered to be "one of the major components of the oriental forest of Madagascar", but mature individuals are believed to have become rare due to extensive selective logging.

Due to overexploitation and the risk of confusion with similar species, Dalbergia monticola and other Dalbergia species from Madagascar were listed in CITES Appendix II in 2013, currently with a zero export quota.

See also 
 Dalbergia maritima, also found only in Madagascar, and similarly threatened.

References 

monticola
Endemic flora of Madagascar
Vulnerable plants
Taxonomy articles created by Polbot
Flora of the Madagascar lowland forests
Flora of the Madagascar subhumid forests